Sergey Sokol (December 17, 1970, Sevastopol) is a Russian political figure, deputy of the 7th and 8th State Dumas. 

From 1992 to 1994, Sokol was an Assistant Secretary of the Embassy of the Russian Federation in Ecuador. From June 1997 to October 2002, Sokol worked at the Norilskgazprom JSC. In 1999-2002, he was the deputy of the Duma of the Taymyr Autonomous Okrug of the 2nd convocation. He left the post on October 22, 2002, as he started a new job at the administration of the Krasnoyarsk Krai. From 2004 to 2008, he worked as Deputy Governor and Chief of Staff of the Administration Council of the Krasnoyarsk Territory. From April 2008 to May 2009, Sokol was the First Deputy Acting Governor of the Irkutsk Oblast. In 2016, he was elected deputy of the 7th State Duma. Since September 2021, he has served as deputy of the 8th State Duma.

In the Duma, Sokol represents the Khakassia region. However, local media has been critical of his activities as a deputy by pointing out the fact that he did not prepare any draft law on any of the crucial issues concerning the region.

References

1970 births
Living people
United Russia politicians
21st-century Russian politicians
Eighth convocation members of the State Duma (Russian Federation)
Seventh convocation members of the State Duma (Russian Federation)